The Monument to the Carabinieri  (also called Monumento ai Fiamma dei Carabinieri) is a steel sculpture located at Piazza Armando Diaz in central Milan, region of Lombardy, Italy. The monument is dedicated in honor of the service of Italian police-men and women. The Fiamma dei Carabinieri which inspired the sculpture is a heraldic symbol most prominently displayed on the caps of Carabinieri, that artistically depicts a grenade, typically inscribed with the letters IR for Italian Republic, and from which curving flames with 13 tips emerge. The flames marks the loyalty, fidelity, ardor and honor that should honor their service.

This monument is a stylized depiction of the Carabinieri symbol, commissioned in 1972 from the sculptor Luciano Minguzzi, and inaugurated in this piazza on 3 December 1981, under the auspices of Giovanni Spadolini, then president of the Milan City Council, and General Carlo Alberto dalla Chiesa. A plaque at the base of the monument now honors dalla Chiesa. The general had led the Italian military's anti-terrorism forces in Lombardy in the mid-1970s, mainly directed against the Red Brigades. In 1982, Dalla Chiesa was appointed prefect of Palermo to stem the violence of the Second Mafia War. As they were driving, Dalla Chiesa, his wife, and an escort agent were assassinated on the orders of a Mafia boss.

References

1981 works
Outdoor sculptures in Italy
Monuments and memorials in Milan